Ammoniacal nitrogen (NH3-N) is a measure for the amount of ammonia, a toxic pollutant often found in landfill leachate and in waste products, such as sewage, liquid manure and other liquid organic waste products. It can also be used as a measure of the health of water in natural bodies such as rivers or lakes, or in man made water reservoirs. The term is used widely in waste treatment and water purification systems.

Ammonia can directly poison humans and upset the equilibrium of water systems. 

The values of ammoniacal nitrogen in water or waste liquids are measured in milligram per liter and are used for specifying water treatment systems and facilities. The typical output of liquid manure from a dairy farm, after separation from the solids is 1600 mg NH3-N /L. Sewage treatment plants, receiving lower values, typically remove 80% and more of input ammonia and reach NH3-N values of 250 mg/L or less.

The ammonium nitrogen value is also used in the context of properly designed landfill systems, where the leachate is being pumped to the surface and treated before it enters the ground water, testing the quality of the water exiting the treatment system.

The term NH3-N removal is also commonly used in scientific publications as a short way to depict Ammonia in water, and not the measure of its quantity.

Structure and Basic Chemical Properties

Ammonium and ammonia forms of nitrogen compounds

Ammonia and Ammonium 
Ammonium is an ionized form of ammonia. 
The chemical structure for ammonium is NH. 
The chemical structure for ammonia is NH3.

Ammonia is highly soluble in water. Ammonia reacts with water (H2O) and forms the ionized form:
NH3 + H2O ↔ NH + OH−
The reaction is reversible. The hydroxide ion (OH−) plus NH forms NH3 + H2O.

The percentage of ammonia increases with increasing alkalinity of dissolved ammonium in water. Ammonium ions are formed with increasing acidity of dissolved ammonia in water.

Ammonia is toxic to fish and humans. The toxicity is decreased with lower alkalinity and increases with higher alkalinity as ammonium is converted to ammonia.

Ammonia and mineral forms of Nitrogen 

There are 3 main forms of nitrogen:
 
 Molecular nitrogen
 Mineral nitrogen
 Organic nitrogen

Molecular nitrogen

Molecular nitrogen is the gas form of nitrogen in the atmosphere. The chemical structure for nitrogen gas is N2.

Mineral nitrogen

The mineral forms of nitrogen are:
 
 Nitrate with the chemical structure of NO
 Nitrite with the chemical structure of NO
 Ammonium ions, with the chemical structure of NH

Ammoniums ions are nitrified and are converted by microorganisms into nitrate. Fish and humans are more tolerant of nitrate nitrogen than they are of ammonium nitrogen. In well aerated water, most of the mineral nitrogen is in the form of nitrate. See

Organic nitrogen

Major organic forms of nitrogen include proteins, amino acids, DNA, and RNA.

See also
Waste treatment
Water purification

References

Ecological data